Rakah may refer to:

 Maki, a communist party in Israel, formerly known as Rakah
 Raka'ah, one unit of Islamic prayer, or Salah

See also
 Raka (disambiguation)